Stella Maeve Johnston (born November 14, 1989) is an American film and television actress.  Highlights include a starring role in The Runaways (2010), a two-season recurring role in NBC television's Chicago P.D., and a main role in SyFy television's The Magicians.

Career

Film 
Maeve's first feature film role was in the comedy-drama, Transamerica (2005).  She had minor roles in the 2008 comedy, Harold, and the crime drama, Brooklyn's Finest (2009).  

In 2010, Maeve played character Sandy West, alongside Kristen Stewart and Dakota Fanning, in The Runaways. The drama is set in the 1970s and is about an all-girl rock band of the same name.

TV 
Maeve made appearances on multiple television series, including recurring roles in Gossip Girl during the 2008–09 season; and in House during the 2010–11 season.  In 2013, Maeve was cast as the younger sister of Detective Walter Clark (Theo James) in CBS's crime drama television series, Golden Boy.  In January 2014, Maeve began appearing in a recurring role on Chicago P.D. . She is a runaway prostitute who eventually becomes the Intelligence Department's secretary, Nadia. Her character was killed off on a Chicago P.D. episode aired in April 2015 entitled "The Number of Rats", during a crossover event with Law & Order: Special Victims Unit and Chicago Fire.  

From 2015 to 2020, she starred as Julia Wicker in the Syfy  series, The Magicians.  In 2019, she was featured in an episode of the CBS drama, God Friended Me.

Music video 
Maeve appeared in the 2014 music video, Figure It Out, by Royal Blood.

Personal life

In an April 2019 Reddit post, Maeve confirmed her engagement to actor Benjamin Wadsworth. They have a daughter, Jo Jezebel.

Filmography

Film

Television

References

Further reading

External links 
 

American film actresses
American television actresses
Living people
21st-century American actresses
1989 births
Place of birth missing (living people)